Pigeon Roost Creek is a stream in the U.S. state of Indiana.

Pigeon Roost Creek was named for the many passenger pigeons that once roosted there.

See also
List of rivers of Indiana

References

Rivers of Clark County, Indiana
Rivers of Scott County, Indiana
Rivers of Washington County, Indiana
Rivers of Indiana